Michael Bohmeyer (born October 1, 1984, in Rüdersdorf) is a German entrepreneur, author and activist for universal basic income. In 2014, he founded the association Mein Grundeinkommen.

Life and career 
Together with others, Bohmeyer founded various companies: the online sign trade Bohmeyer & Schuster GmbH, the social network want2do AG and the technology startup admineo UG.

As a passive co-owner of Bohmeyer & Schuster since 2013, Bohmeyer receives an annual profit distribution. He perceived this unpowered income as „eine Art Bedingungsloses Grundeinkommen“ ("a kind of unconditional basic income"). Inspired by this experience, he founded the non-governmental organization Mein Grundeinkommen in 2014. The NGO uses crowdfunding to collect money to be raffled off as a one-year basic income of 1,000 euros per month among the people registered on its website. As of 2021, over 800 people have gained a one-year basic income.

In 2015 Bohmeyer took part in the establishment of the association Sanktionsfrei, which offers recipients of  legal and financial help.

In 2018 the documentary film Free Lunch Society - Come Come Basic Income was released, with Michael Bohmeyer as initiator and founder of Mein Grundeinkommen.

In 2021, he appeared on the ZDF program „13 Fragen“.

Film 

 2018: Free Lunch Society - Come Come Basic Income. Documentary film, Austria / Germany, director: Christian Tod; production: Golden Girls with Michael Bohmeyer and others

Works 

2019: Michael Bohmeyer and : Was würdest Du tun? Wie uns das Bedingungslose Grundeinkommen verändert, Econ Verlag 2019, ISBN 3430210070

References

External links 

Living people
German male writers
German company founders
1984 births
Universal basic income in Germany
Universal basic income activists